Reverend Canon Thomas Henry Davis (1867–1947) was an English cathedral organist, who served in Wells Cathedral and was the only person ever to hold a simultaneous post of canon of a cathedral and organist of the old foundation cathedrals.

Background

Thomas Henry Davis was born on 25 September 1867 in Birmingham and educated at King Edward's School, Birmingham.

In 1892 he became curate at the Collegiate Church of St Mary, Warwick, moving to Wells Cathedral in 1895 as priest vicar. In 1912 he was appointed a prebendary of the cathedral and became precentor and canon residentiary in 1920. He remained in this post until his death in Wells in October 1947.

Career

Organist of:
St Matthew's Church, Birmingham 
Wells Cathedral 1899 - 1933

References

English classical organists
British male organists
Cathedral organists
1867 births
1947 deaths
People educated at King Edward's School, Birmingham
Musicians from Birmingham, West Midlands
20th-century English Anglican priests
Male classical organists